Sharad Anantrao Joshi (3 September 1935 – 12 December 2015) was an Indian politician who founded the Swatantra Bharat Paksh party and Shetkari Sanghatana (farmers' Organisation), He was also a Member of the Parliament of India representing Maharashtra in the Rajya Sabha, the upper house of the Indian Parliament during the period 5 July 2004 till  4 July 2010. On 9 January 2010 he was the sole MP in Rajya Sabha to vote against the bill providing 33% reservation for women in Indian parliament and assemblies.

Sharad Anantrao Joshi was a member of Advisory Board of the World Agricultural Forum (WAF), the foremost global agricultural platform that initiates dialogue between those who can impact agriculture. He is also founder of Shetkari Sanghatana, an organisation for farmers. Shetakari Sanghatana is a non-political union of Farmers formed with the aim to "Freedom of access to markets and to Technology".

Early life, education and Career

Sharad Joshi was born on 3 September 1935 at Satara, in the state of Maharashtra, India. He is a son of Anant Narayan (1905–70) and Indirabai Joshi (1910–92). He  obtained  a master's degree  in Commerce from Sydenham College, Mumbai, in 1957 and, Diploma in Informatics from Lausanne in  1974. 
During his career he obtained many awards including  Award C.E. Randle Gold Medal for Banking (1955), and Cursetjee Dady Prize for work on Computation of Irrigation Benefits. He worked as a Lecturer in Economics and Statistics, University of Poona, 1957–58. Later he worked for  I.P.S Indian Postal Service (Class I) 1958–68; His international career included a long stint as Chief of  Informatics Service at International Bureau, UPU, Bern, Switzerland, 1968–77. He served as a United Nations officer before founding Shetakari Sanghatana.

Farmer's issues 
He was a founder of Shetkari Sanghatana, farmers' Organisation in Maharashtra. He led number of mass agitations on agricultural issues in India. Most of them in the state of Maharashtra on issues of prices offered to Farmers. He was also founder Leader of ' Kisan Coordination Committee (KCC)' composed of sister organisations from 14 states – Maharashtra, Karnataka, Gujarat, Rajasthan, Punjab, Haryana, Himachal Pradesh, Madhya Pradesh, Bihar, Uttar Pradesh, Orissa, Andhra Pradesh, Tamil Nadu, Kerala; led a number of agitations in Maharashtra, Karnataka, Gujarat, Punjab, Haryana etc. for remunerative prices of onions, sugar cane, tobacco, milk, paddy, cotton, against hike in electricity tariffs, for liquidation of rural debts and against State dumping in domestic markets. He lost Maharashtra Legislative Assembly election to Ashok Shinde of Shivsena from Hinganghat constituency in 1995.

Joshi was an economic liberal who demanded reduction of state control in agriculture sector. He supported  the WTO because he believed  that Indian farming could be profitable if farmers had access to the global market. He was credited with coining the term Bharat vs India to highlight the neglect of rural farmers by urban elites.

In his will, he left most of his estate to the Shetkari Trust, which is entrusted to take his work forward.
He had been a columnist for the dailies 'The Times of India', ' Business India', 'Lokmat' etc., and  also authored books on agricultural issues.

Shetkari Mahila Aghadi (SMA)
Sharad Joshi was also a founder of the largest organisation of rural women Shetkari Mahila Aghadi (SMA) celebrated for its work for women's property rights notably for the Lakshmi Mukti programme that has conferred land titles on lakhs of rural housewives.

In 1986, Chandwad village of Nasik district in Maharashtra was witness to a gathering of over two lakh peasant women.

Special Economic Zones for farm 

Sharad Joshi advocated SEZs in areas of India's comparative advantage, notably organic farming, aromatic and medicinal plants, manufacture of hybrid seeds and horticulture. Joshi also voiced on the need to establish credible certifying agencies for organic farm products and also suggested exclusive Zones for growing variety of onions popular in the Western countries and also the domestic market could be insulated from the international markets, and shortages could be averted even while earning foreign exchange.

Socialism and Indian Constitution 
In December 2005 Sharad Joshi tabled private member legislation in the Rajya Sabha, demanding deletion of the word socialism from the Representation of the People Act of the Constitution of India.

Publications 
A partial list of his writings and works includes:
 English
 Organisation of Peasants: Thought and Practice
 Bharat Speaks Out (1982)
 Bharat Eyeview  (1986)
 The Women's Question (1986),
 Answering Before God (1994)

 Marathi
 AngarMala (अंगारमळा)
 Anwayarth (अन्वयार्थ) Part 1 and 2
 Arth To Sangato Punha (अर्थ तो सांगतो पुन्हा)
 Khulya Vyavasthekade - Khulya Manane (खुल्या व्यवस्थेकडे - खुल्या मनाने)
 Chandawadchi Shidori - Striyancha Prashn (चांदवडची शिदोरी - स्त्रियांचा प्रश्न)
 Jag Badalnari Pustake (जग बदलणारी पुस्तके)
 Poshindyachi Lokshahi (पोशिंद्याची लोकशाही)
 Prachalit Arthavyvasthevar Nava Prakash (प्रचलित अर्थव्यवस्थेवर नवा प्रकाश)
 Baliche Rajya Yenar Aahe (बळीचे राज्य येणार आहे)
 Bharatasthi (भारतासाठी)
 Mazya Shetkari Bhavanno Aani Maybahininno (माझ्या शेतकरी भावांनो आणि मायबहिणींनो)
 Rashtriya Krushineetee (राष्ट्रीय कृषिनीती)
 Shetkari Sanghatana : Vichar Aani Karyapaddhatee (शेतकरी संघटना : विचार आणि कार्यपद्धती)
 Shetkaryacha Raaja Shivaji Aani Itar Lekh (शेतकर्याचा राजा शिवाजी आणि इतर लेख)
 Swatantrya Ka Nasle? (स्वातंत्र्य का नासले?)

Hindi
 Samasyayen Bharat Ki (समस्याए भारत की)
 Swatantrata Kyon Naakam Hui (स्वतंत्रता क्यों नाकाम हो गई?)

References 

 Tom Brass. New farmers' movements in India , Length 290pages, Routledge, 1995, .

External links
 Profile on Ministry of Agriculture, Government of India website
 Sharad Joshi Dot In, Articles written by Sharad Anantrao Joshi

Rajya Sabha members from Maharashtra
Marathi politicians
2015 deaths
Indian farmers
1935 births
Indian classical liberals
Indian civil servants
Swabhimani Paksha politicians
Farmers' rights activists